SS Valley Camp is a lake freighter that served on the Great Lakes for almost 50 years and is now a museum ship in Sault Ste. Marie, Michigan.

History 
Valley Camp was launched in Lorain, Ohio, in 1917 as the Louis W. Hill for the National Steel Corporation. She sailed for this company for 38 years hauling iron ore and coal until 1955 when she was sold to the Wilson Marine Transit Company. It was in this fleet that she received her current name. For this company she carried a wider array of bulk goods including grains and stone. Valley Camp was a member of the Wilson Fleet only until 1959 when the Republic Steel Corporation bought her and several of her Wilson fleetmates, including her identical sister ship Silver Bay (formerly Albert Heiken of National Steel). Republic kept Valley Camps name, and for that company she hauled iron ore and coal to their mills in Buffalo, New York; Cleveland, Ohio; and Indiana Harbor, Indiana. In 1966, Valley Camp made her last voyage. Her age was not an issue in her retirement, but a major problem with a coal-burning boiler was. Her twin, Silver Bay, went on to sail until the early 1980s.

Purchased by Le Sault de Sainte Marie Historical Sites, Inc., for $10,000, the ship was towed from Wisconsin to Sault Ste. Marie on July 6, 1968, during Sault Ste. Marie's tri-centennial celebration. As a museum ship, Valley Camp is listed on the National Register of Historic Places. Visitors have the opportunity to explore and look in every nook and cranny of the ship.

Valley Camp is well maintained and has brought in many tourists to Sault Sainte Marie.

The ship 
Valley Camp stretches  overall with a  keel. Her gross tonnage capacity is 12,000 gross tons. The ship was powered by a  triple expansion reciprocating steam engine which she retains to this day. Never the flagship of the fleet, her quarters were spartan yet comfortable. The crews quarters are lined by wood trim and equipped with simple bunks. The wheelhouse is lined with wood and trimmed by brass. Her original steering wheel is in place. In the stern, her original smokestack, including her double-chime whistle are still in place. Almost unmodified from her original configuration, she is the most intact example of the classic Great Lakes ore carriers that once numbered in the hundreds and few of which survive to this day.

Gallery

References

External links 

Valley Camp
Valley Camp
Valley Camp
Museums in Chippewa County, Michigan
Michigan State Historic Sites
Great Lakes freighters
Buildings and structures in Sault Ste. Marie, Michigan
1917 ships
National Register of Historic Places in Chippewa County, Michigan
Ships built in Lorain, Ohio